Uttarpara Assembly constituency is an assembly constituency in Hooghly district in the Indian state of West Bengal.

Overview
As per orders of the Delimitation Commission, No. 185 Uttarpara Assembly constituency  is composed of the following: Uttarpara Kotrung Municipality, Konnagar Municipality and Nabagram, Kanaipur, Raghunathpur gram panchayats of Sreerampur Uttarpara community development block.

Uttarpara Assembly constituency is part of No. 27 Sreerampur (Lok Sabha constituency).

Members of Legislative Assembly

Election results

2021

2016

2011

1977-2006
In the 2006 state assembly elections, Prof. Dr. Srutinath Praharaj of CPI(M) won the Uttarpara assembly seat defeating Sudpita Roy of Trinamool Congress. Contests in most years were multi cornered but only winners and runners are being mentioned. Jyoti Krishna Chattopadhyay of CPI(M) defeated Indrajit Ghosh of Trinamool Congress in 2003 by-poll, which was held following the demise of sitting MLA Prof. Swaraj  Mukherjee. Prof. Swaraj  Mukherjee of Trinamool Congress defeated Jyoti Krishna Chattopadhyay of CPI(M) in 2001. Jyoti Krishna Chattopadhyay of CPI(M) defeated Pabitra Gupta of Congress in 1996. Santasri Chatterjee of CPI(M) defeated Jagat Chatterjee of Congress 1991 and 1987, Sukumar Ghosh of Congress in 1982, and Kashinath Banerjee of Janata Party in 1977.

1951-1972
Santasri Chatterjee of CPI(M) won in 1972 and 1971. Monoranjan Hazra of CPI/CPI(M) won in 1969, 1967, 1962, 1957 and in independent India's first election in 1951.

References

Assembly constituencies of West Bengal
Politics of Hooghly district